The 2015 Homs car bombing was a twin-explosion car bombing that killed 16 and injured many more. It occurred near a hospital in al-Zahra, an Alawite populated, government-controlled Neighborhood east of Homs' old city. The attack came five days after the government and rebels agreed on a local ceasefire in the western al-Waer suburb.

References

Terrorist incidents in Syria in 2015
ISIL terrorist incidents in Syria
Persecution of Alawites
December 2015 events in Syria
History of Homs Governorate
Homs
Mass murder in 2015